108th meridian may refer to:

108th meridian east, a line of longitude east of the Greenwich Meridian
108th meridian west, a line of longitude west of the Greenwich Meridian